Sonja Nef (born 19 April 1972) is a Swiss former alpine skier. Nef was women's World Champion in Giant Slalom in 2001. She won the 2001 and 2002 World Cup in Giant Slalom. At the 2002 Winter Olympics, she finished third in Giant Slalom.

Career
The injury made itself felt in the following winter of 2003/04 in a declining level of performance. Although Nef was able to achieve a podium finish in the slalom for the last time, further good results became rarer. This trend continued in the winter of 2004/05. Her best placings were two fifth places. In the 2005/06 season, an inflammation of her hip gave her a hard time. Nef was never ranked better than 20th and was unable to qualify for the 2006 Winter Olympics.

World Cup results

Season titles
 2 titles – (2 GS)

Season standings

Race podiums 

 15 wins – (13 GS, 2 SL)
 32 podiums – (24 GS, 8 SL)

Olympic results

World Championship results

References

External links
 
 
 Sonja Nef fan page

1972 births
Living people
Swiss female alpine skiers
Olympic bronze medalists for Switzerland
Alpine skiers at the 1998 Winter Olympics
Alpine skiers at the 2002 Winter Olympics
Olympic alpine skiers of Switzerland
Olympic medalists in alpine skiing
FIS Alpine Ski World Cup champions
Medalists at the 2002 Winter Olympics
21st-century Swiss women